The Gypsy Chief (German: Der Zigeunerprimas) is a 1929 German silent drama film directed by Carl Wilhelm and starring Paul Heidemann, Margarete Schlegel and Fritz Schulz. Robert A. Dietrich worked as the film's art director.

Cast
 Paul Heidemann as Béla Baron Cadossy 
 Margarete Schlegel as Julischka 
 Fritz Schulz as Gaston Graf Irini, Attaché 
 Robert Garrison as Bankier Rothschild 
 Hugo Flink as Dobrenko, Gesandter 
 Carl Geppert as Finanzminister Mustari 
 Melitta Klefer as Ungarische Magd 
 Emmy Wyda as Pensionsvorsteherin
 Fritz Beckmann   
 Kurt Brenkendorf   
 Franz Cornelius   
 Egon Dorn   
 Gyula Szőreghy
 Ernő Verebes

References

Bibliography
 Prawer, S.S. Between Two Worlds: The Jewish Presence in German and Austrian Film, 1910-1933. Berghahn Books, 2005.

External links

1929 films
Films of the Weimar Republic
1929 drama films
German silent feature films
German drama films
Films directed by Carl Wilhelm
Films set in Hungary
Films based on operettas
Films about Romani people
Films with screenplays by Franz Schulz
German black-and-white films
Silent drama films
1920s German films